MJ Gallery at Ponte 16 (MJ Gallery) is an art gallery located on the second floor of the Ponte 16, Ponte 12A - 20, Rua das Lorchas e Rua do Visconde Paço de Arcos, Macau. It is the first Michael Jackson-themed gallery in Asia, and the second permanent exhibition venue in the world to exhibit artifacts from the life and work of Michael Jackson.

History
Hoffman Ma Ho Man, the executive director and deputy chairman of Success Universe Group Limited, began a collection of Michael Jackson memorabilia when he spent $350,000 USD at Julien's Auctions on November 22, 2009, in Times Square, New York City.  on a crystal glove that Jackson wore in 1983 during a televised performance as part of the 25th anniversary of Motown.

In addition, he purchased ten other items: including a platinum music recording sales certification by the Recording Industry Association of America, which is signed by Jackson. There were more than 40 Jackson-related items in the auction.

The MJ Gallery facilities
The MJ Gallery covers more than 4,000 square meters and accommodates approximately 200 people per hour.

It is divided into four sections: Time Tunnel, Main Exhibition Hall, Billie Jean Setting, and the Ponte 16 Gift Gallery. 
 Time Tunnel: features  "MJ, The King of Pop" at the entrance, with Michael Jackson and the Jackson 5 as the first stop in Michael Jackson's biography.
 Main Exhibition Hall: features Neverland Ranch, "We Are the World", and Thriller artworks and album materials.
 Billie Jean Setting: features scenes from the music video "Thriller, including CD covers of Michael Jackson albums, and his suit from Men in Black II .
 Ponte 16 Gift Gallery: Offers Michael Jackson-themed gifts and souvenirs.

References

External links

Michael Jackson
Museums in Macau